Gavrilovsky District is an administrative and municipal district (raion), one of the twenty-three in Tambov Oblast, Russia. It is located in the east of the oblast. The district borders with Pichayevsky District in the north, Belinsky District of Penza Oblast in the east, Kirsanovsky District in the south, and with Bondarsky District in the west. Its administrative center is the rural locality (a selo) of Gavrilovka 2-ya. Population: 12,032 (2010 Census);  The population of Gavrilovka 2-ya accounts for 22.2% of the district's total population.

Geography
Gavrilovsky District is on the east-central side of Tambov Oblast, bordering on Penza Oblast.  The district is about 70 km east of the city of Tambov, 50 km southeast of Morshansk, and 15 km north of Kirsanov.  The Vorona River runs through the towards the south in the eastern sector of the district.  The river ultimately empties into the Khopyor River and then the Don River.   Gavrilovsky District is on the eastern edge of the Oka–Don Lowland, leading east into the Volga Uplands. The terrain is flat with draws and ravines, with steppe and forest-steppe vegetation. The black soil of the district supports agriculture. The federal highway R-209 (Penza–Tambov) runs through the district.

The district measures about 40 km north–south and west–east. The administrative center of the district is the city of Gavrilovka 2-ya.

As of January, 2016, the three largest towns are Gavrilovka 2-ya (pop. 3,396), Peresypkinsky (pop. 2,313), and Kozmodemyanovsky (pop. 1,336).

Climate
The climate is Humid continental climate, cool summer, (Dfb). This climate is characterized by large swings in temperature, both diurnally and seasonally, with mild summers and cold, snowy winters.

Economy
Employment in the district is focused on food processing and agriculture.

Agriculture
Gavrilovsky is an agricultural district, with farm revenues split about 30% crops and 70% livestock (including dairy).  The most important grains are sunflower, barley, and wheat.  Approximately 49,319 hectares (50%) of the total area of the district is in cultivation for crops. In 2014, the top seven crops by area were:

Notable residents 

Zoya Kosmodemyanskaya (1923–1941), Soviet partisan, Hero of the Soviet Union, from the village of Osino-Gay
Aleksandr Kosmodemyansky (1925–1945), first lieutenant, Hero of the Soviet Union, from the village of Osino-Gay

References

Sources

External links
 Gavrilovsky Official map of the district
 Gavrilovsky District on OpenStreetMap.org
 Gavrilovsky District on GoogleMaps

Districts of Tambov Oblast